Pandan Bikol, or Northern Catanduanes Bicolano, is one of the three groups of the Bikol languages. It is spoken in Pandan and northeastern portion of Catanduanes.

Examples

Wh-questions
What? – , 
Who? – , 
Where? – , 
When? – 
How? – 
How many? – 
Who are you? – , 
What is your name? – 
When is your birthday? –  / 
Where do you live? –

Animals
Cow – 
Carabao – 
Pig – ,  (male brooding pig)
Rat – 
Ant – , 
Chicken – , 
Lizard – 
Gecko – 
Snake – 
Bird –

Counting
One – , 
Two – , 
Three – , 
Four – , 
Five – , 
Six – , 
Seven – ,
Eight – , 
Nine – , 
Ten – , 
One hundred – 
One thousand –

Common adjectives
Beautiful – 
Ugly –  , 
Hot – , 
Cold – 
Good – 
Bad – , 
Great – , 
Sick – , 
Fast – , 
Slow – 
High – 
Low – 
Deep – 
Wide – 
Loose – 
Narrow – , 
Heavy – 
Dark – ,

References

External links

Bikol languages
Languages of Catanduanes